Kherson Oblast is subdivided into five districts (raions) which are subdivided into territorial communities (hromadas).

Current

On 18 July 2020, the number of districts was reduced from eighteen to five (which now also includes the four former city municipalities). These are:
 Beryslav (Бериславський район), the center is in the town of Beryslav;
 Henichesk (Генічеський район), the center is in the town of Henichesk; 
 Kakhovka (Каховський район), the center is in the town of Nova Kakhovka; 
 Kherson (Херсонський район), the center is in the city of Kherson;
 Skadovsk (Скадовський район), the center is in the town of Skadovsk.

Administrative divisions until 2020

Before July 2020, Kherson Oblast was subdivided into 22 regions: 18 districts (raions) and 4 city municipalities (mis'krada or misto), officially known as territories governed by city councils.

Cities under the oblast's jurisdiction:
Kherson Municipality 
Cities and towns under the city's jurisdiction:
Kherson (Херсон), the administrative center of the oblast 
Urban-type settlements under the city's jurisdiction:
Antonivka (Антонівка)
Komyshany (Комишани)
Naddniprianske (Наддніпрянське)
Zelenivka (Зеленівка)
Hola Prystan Municipality 
Cities and towns under the city's jurisdiction:
Hola Prystan (Гола Пристань)
Kakhovka (Каховка)
Nova Kakhovka Municipality 
Cities and towns under the city's jurisdiction:
Nova Kakhovka (Нова Каховка) 
Tavriisk (Таврійськ)
Urban-type settlements under the city's jurisdiction:
Dnipriany (Дніпряни)
Districts (raions):
Beryslav  (Бериславський район)
Cities and towns under the district's jurisdiction:
Beryslav (Берислав)
Urban-type settlements under the district's jurisdiction:
Kozatske (Козацьке)
Bilozerka  (Білозерський район)
Urban-type settlements under the district's jurisdiction:
Bilozerka (Білозерка)
Chaplynka  (Чаплинський район)
Urban-type settlements under the district's jurisdiction:
Chaplynka (Чаплинка)
Askania-Nova (Асканія-Нова)
Henichesk  (Генічеський район)
Cities and towns under the district's jurisdiction:
Henichesk (Генічеськ)
Urban-type settlements under the district's jurisdiction:
Novooleksiivka (Новоолексіївка)
Rykove (Рикове), formerly Partyzany
Hola Prystan  (Голопристанський район)
Hornostaivka  (Горностаївський район)
Urban-type settlements under the district's jurisdiction:
Hornostaivka (Горностаївка)
Ivanivka  (Іванівський район)
Urban-type settlements under the district's jurisdiction:
Ivanivka (Іванівка)
Kakhovka  (Каховський район)
Urban-type settlements under the district's jurisdiction:
Liubymivka (Любимівка)
Kalanchak  (Каланчацький район)
Urban-type settlements under the district's jurisdiction:
Kalanchak (Каланчак)
Myrne (Мирне)
Nyzhni Sirohozy  (Нижньосірогозький район)
Urban-type settlements under the district's jurisdiction:
Nyzhni Sirohozy (Нижні Сірогози)
Novotroitske  (Новотроїцький район)
Urban-type settlements under the district's jurisdiction:
Novotroitske (Новотроїцьке)
Syvaske (Сиваське)
Novovorontsovka  (Нововоронцовський район)
Urban-type settlements under the district's jurisdiction:
Novovorontsovka (Нововоронцовка)
Oleshky  (Олешківський), formerly Tsiurupynsk Raion
Cities and towns under the district's jurisdiction:
Oleshky (Олешки), formerly Tsiurupynsk
Urban-type settlements under the district's jurisdiction:
Brylivka (Брилівка)
Nova Maiachka (Нова Маячка)
Skadovsk  (Скадовський район)
Cities and towns under the district's jurisdiction:
Skadovsk (Скадовськ)
Urban-type settlements under the district's jurisdiction:
Lazurne (Лазурне)
Velyka Lepetykha  (Великолепетиський район)
Urban-type settlements under the district's jurisdiction:
Velyka Lepetykha (Велика Лепетиха)
Velyka Oleksandrivka  (Великоолександрівський район)
Urban-type settlements under the district's jurisdiction:
Bila Krynytsia (Біла Криниця)
Kalynivske (Калинівське), formerly Kalininske
Karierne (Кар'єрне)
Velyka Oleksandrivka (Велика Олександрівка)
Verkhniy Rohachyk  (Верхньорогачицький район)
Urban-type settlements under the district's jurisdiction:
Verkhnii Rohachyk (Верхній Рогачик)
Vysokopillia  (Високопільський район)
Urban-type settlements under the district's jurisdiction:
Arkhanhelske (Архангельське)
Vysokopillia (Високопілля)

References

Kherson
Kherson Oblast